Nkosilathi Nungu (born 12 February 2001) is a Zimbabwean cricketer. In December 2020, he was named in the Rocks' squad for the 2020–21 Logan Cup. He made his List A debut on 24 April 2021, for Rocks, in the 2020–21 Pro50 Championship. Prior to his List A debut, he was named in Zimbabwe's squad for the 2018 Under-19 Cricket World Cup. He made his first-class debut on 12 February 2022, for Rocks in the 2021–22 Logan Cup in Zimbabwe.

References

External links
 

2001 births
Living people
Zimbabwean cricketers
Southern Rocks cricketers
Place of birth missing (living people)